Diego Oscar Monarriz (born 2 March 1968) is an Argentine football manager and former player who played as a midfielder. He is the current assistant manager of Brazilian club Atlético Mineiro.

Career
Monarriz played for San Lorenzo, All Boys, Belgrano and El Porvenir in his home country, aside from a short period at South African side Orlando Pirates. After retiring, he worked as a youth coach before taking over San Lorenzo in an interim manner in 2018, after Claudio Biaggio resigned.

Monarriz returned to his previous role after the appointment of Jorge Almirón, but on 1 November 2019, he replaced Juan Antonio Pizzi as manager; initially an interim, he was later promoted to manager. He resigned on 22 February 2020, and subsequently returned to the reserve squad.

In 2022, Monarriz was Leandro Somoza's assistant at Rosario Central and Aldosivi, before joining Eduardo Coudet's staff at Brazilian club Atlético Mineiro ahead of the 2023 season.

References

External links

1968 births
Living people
Footballers from Buenos Aires
Argentine footballers
Association football midfielders
Argentine Primera División players
San Lorenzo de Almagro footballers
All Boys footballers
Club Atlético Belgrano footballers
El Porvenir footballers
Orlando Pirates F.C. players
Argentine football managers
Argentine Primera División managers
San Lorenzo de Almagro managers